This is a list of those people who were heir apparent or heir presumptive to the Kingdom of Prussia from its foundation in 1701 to the end of the monarchy in 1918. From 18 January 1871 the Crown Prince of Prussia was also heir apparent to the German Empire. Those heirs who succeeded are shown in bold.

Heirs to the Kingdom of Prussia

Heirs to the German Empire and the Kingdom of Prussia

References

Prussia
Prussia
Heirs to the throne